The 2000 UCI Cyclo-cross World Championships were held in Sint-Michielsgestel, Netherlands on Saturday January 28 and Sunday January 29, 2000. This was the first year that a women's event was held. The track for the race was 2660 meter long with 700 meter road, 1080 meter grass and 880 meter forest trail.

Schedule 

 Saturday January 29, 2000
 11:00 Women's Elite
 14:00 Men's Under 23
 Sunday January 30, 2000
 11:00 Men's Juniors
 14:00 Men's Elite

Medal summary

Medal table

Men's Elite
 Held on Sunday January 29, 2000

Women's Elite
 Held on Sunday January 29, 2000

Notes

UCI Cyclo-cross World Championships
World Championships
C
C
February 2000 sports events in Europe